817 Naval Air Squadron was a unit of the Royal Navy Fleet Air Arm during the Second World War.

In 1941, the squadron operated Fairey Albacore aircraft in the Anti-Submarine Warfare role in Icelandic and Mediterranean waters. The Squadron was reformed in 1943, with Fairey Barracuda aircraft and carried out operations in the Far East before disbanding at the end of the war.

The squadron was reformed as 817 Squadron RAN in 1950.

Aircraft
Fairey Albacore I March 1941–August 1943
Fairey Barracuda II December 1943–January 1945
Barracuda II (ASH) April 1945–August 1945

Military units and formations established in 1941
800 series Fleet Air Arm squadrons